The 2001 2. divisjon was the third highest football league for men in Norway.

26 games were played in 4 groups—changed from the 8 groups in the 2000 season—with 3 points given for wins and 1 for draws. Tollnes, Åsane, Oslo Øst and Lørenskog were promoted to the 1. divisjon. Number twelve, thirteen and fourteen were relegated to the 3. divisjon. The winning teams from each of the 24 groups in the 3. divisjon each faced a winning team from another group in a playoff match, resulting in 12 playoff winners which were promoted to the 2. divisjon.

League tables

Group 1

Group 2

Group 3

Group 4

Promotion play-offs

References
Fixtures and table, group 1
Fixtures and table, group 2. Note: for some reason, Åsane is missing.
Fixtures and table, group 3
Fixtures and table, group 4

Norwegian Second Division seasons
3
Norway
Norway